Ambrish Mithal is an Indian endocrinologist and the Chairman and Head of Endocrinology and Diabetes at Max Healthcare- Pan-Max, Saket, New Delhi, where he started working in December 2019. He secured the master's degree (DM) from the All India Institute of Medical Sciences, New Delhi,  and subsequently worked at Sanjay Gandhi Post Graduate Institute of Medical Sciences, Lucknow and, later, at Apollo Hospitals, New Delhi before joining Medanta the Medicity as Chairman, Division of  Endocrinology and Diabetes where he worked from 2009 to 2019. Mithal was honoured by the Government of India in 2015 with Padma Bhushan, the third highest Indian civilian award, for his outstanding contribution to the field of medicine. In September 2020 Dr Mithal became the first Indian to be chosen for the Laureate Award for International Excellence in Endocrinology (2021) by the Endocrine Society (US).

In 2019, Dr Mithal was nominated to the Governing Council of the National Health Authority, the apex body involved in implementing the ambitious population health coverage plan of the government. He has also been appointed (honorary) President, All India Institute of Medical Sciences, Gorakhpur.

Dr Mithal was awarded the International Osteoporosis Foundation President's award in March 2016. In March 2017 Dr Mithal was awarded the B C Roy award by the President of India (for the year 2015) for his contribution to the development of endocrinology in India. He has won numerous awards from medical and social bodies throughout his career.

Dr Mithal is keenly interested in spreading awareness about endocrine disorders among the general public. He writes a regular column in the OPEN magazine, frequently contributes articles in Hindi to the Dainik Jagran, and has been on numerous health shows on TV. He has also hosted a show called 'Beat Diabetes' on NDTV from 2016 onwards, and is frequently interviewed on most other national channels including Doordarshan. He also contributes from time to time to other leading magazines like India Today and The Week, along with popular daily newspapers.

EXCERPTS FROM THE PADMA BHUSHAN CITATION (UPDATED SEP 2019)

Dr Mithal has made pioneering contribution to the development of the speciality of endocrinology in India in all its aspects- academic, clinical and social- and has played a key role in placing Indian endocrinology on the global map.

While at AIIMS- in the mid 1980s- he assisted in studies related to iodine deficiency, which paved the way for the universal salt iodation program in India. Later, when he was on the faculty of Sanjay Gandhi Post Graduate Institute of Medical Sciences (SGPGIMS), Lucknow,  he carried out seminal research on fluoride toxicity in Unnao, UP, which affects more than 60 million people in India. He was subsequently awarded the prestigious Fogarty fellowship to conduct research at Harvard Medical School (1993–94), where he worked on the calcium sensing receptor.

In 1997, Dr Mithal established India’s first bone density measurement system and osteoporosis service in SGPGIMS Lucknow.  He was the first Indian to be trained in bone density measurement, as a JICA fellow, in Japan. Dr Mithal was the first to establish osteoporosis as a serious health problem in India that affects an estimated 50 million people, and among the first to establish the existence of widespread vitamin D deficiency in India. He is a strong advocate of vitamin D fortification,  and has actively lobbied with the government in this regard. At the Food Standards and Safety Authority of India, he played a key advisory role in initiating fortification of edible oil and milk with vitamin D to help tackle vitamin D deficiency in India, a condition which affects more than 80 percent urban Indians.

Dr Mithal was the technical advisor for the World Diabetes Foundation/ Jagran Pehel initiative on diabetes and pregnancy- a program that was run across 5 states, with major direct population outreach for spreading awareness among women and schoolgirls. Gestational diabetes affects more than 15 percent of Indian women. He has also led a nutrition and growth program for underprivileged children in two schools.

Dr Mithal is the first Indian to serve on international bodies like the WHO Global Task force on Osteoporosis and Committee of Scientific Advisors,  Asia Pacific Advisory Council and Board of Governance of the International Osteoporosis Foundation.  In addition Dr Mithal has been President of the Endocrine Society of India, Indian Society for Bone and Mineral Research (ISBMR), and Bone and Joint Decade.  He has also served two terms as Editor in Chief- Indian Journal of Endocrinology and Metabolism. He was a member of the Governing Council of the Indian Council of Medical Research from 2014-2017, and is currently the President of the Endocrine and Diabetes Foundation.

Dr Mithal is recognised as an able and popular mentor - students trained by him over the last 25 years occupy positions of importance across the globe. In particular, many of his students have helped establish endocrinology as a speciality across India -providing high quality patient care and achieving academic excellence.

Dr Ambrish Mithal is the first and only Indian to receive the "Boy Frame Award" of the American Society of Bone and Mineral Research (Adult Bone and Mineral Working Group), in 2004. He also received the International Osteoporosis Foundation Health Professional Awareness award (for ISBMR) in 2005. His paper on "Global Vitamin D Status’ was awarded the Springer citation prize in 2013. His recent paper (2018) on use of Empagliflozin for treating fatty liver  has generated  great interest globally and has been widely cited. He has received numerous awards from various Indian associations, including Doctor of the year (2005), "Distinguished contribution in the field of medicine", "Medical statesman of the year" and others.

See also

 Endocrinology
 Diabetology

References

Recipients of the Padma Bhushan in medicine
Living people
Indian endocrinologists
Scientists from Lucknow
Indian diabetologists
20th-century Indian medical doctors
1958 births
Medical doctors from Uttar Pradesh